The 2004 Formula Renault V6 Eurocup season began on the weekend of 27 March at Monza. 2004 was the last season of this championship because Renault created World Series by Renault in 2005, merging Formula Renault V6 Eurocup and World Series by Nissan. The titles went to Swiss driver Giorgio Mondini and Italian team EuroInternational.

Entry List

Race calendar and results

Championship standings
Points are awarded in both races as follows: 30, 24, 20, 14, 10, 8, 6, 4, 2 and 2 bonus points for fastest lap.
Due to climatic conditions, the French sprint race had to be stopped. Half points were awarded.

Drivers

Teams

References

External links
 Speedsportmag.com, results, entry list, calendar.
 Nuvolari3000.com, series results.
 renault-sport.com, official web site of the series.

Renault V6 Eurocup season 2004
Formula Renault V6 Eurocup seasons
2004 in European sport
Renault V6 Eurocup